Breathing Together: Revolution of the Electric Family is a Canadian documentary film, directed by Morley Markson and released in 1971. The film is a profile of many of the politically and culturally radical figures who established and defined counterculture in the 1960s.

Figures appearing in the film include Don Cox, Buckminster Fuller, Allen Ginsberg, Fred Hampton, John Lennon, Abbie Hoffman, William Kunstler, Timothy Leary, Jerry Rubin and John Sinclair.

The film premiered on April 15, 1971 at the Whitney Museum in New York City, as part of the New American Filmmakers Series. It was subsequently screened in the International Critics' Week program at the 1971 Cannes Film Festival, and had its Canadian premiere at Toronto's Poor Alex Theatre's summer screening series of Canadian films in June 1971.

A sequel, Growing Up in America, was released in 1988 to profile the ways in which many of the figures profiled in the original film had evolved from "yippies" into "yuppies".

References

External links
 

1971 films
1971 documentary films
Canadian documentary films
1970s English-language films
1970s Canadian films